Barbarea australis, commonly known as native wintercress or riverbed wintercress, is a morphologically and ecologically typical Barbarea species with an unusual distribution: it is an endemic and threatened species from Tasmania. The leaves have a large end-lobe and only few side lobes, much like the leaf-shape of Barbarea stricta and Barbarea orthoceras. With regard to defence chemicals (glucosinolates), it is similar to other members of the genus.

Cultivation
Although the plant remains critically endangered in the wild, Native wintercress is available for home garden cultivation. All above-ground parts of the plant are edible, with the leaves tasting similar to rocket.

References

australis
Flora of Tasmania
Plants described in 1852
Taxa named by Joseph Dalton Hooker
Plants described in 1853